New York's 15th congressional district is a congressional district for the United States House of Representatives located in New York City, State of New York. The district has been represented by Democrat Ritchie Torres since 2021.

The 15th district is located entirely within the Bronx, namely the southern portion of the West Bronx as well as the South Bronx. Latinos make up the majority of the district's population, followed by Black people. Whites, Asians and other racial groups comprise a small minority. Yankee Stadium and the Bronx Zoo are both located within the district.

From 2003 to 2013 it was composed of Upper Manhattan, Rikers Island and a largely non-residential section of northwestern Queens on the shore of the East River mostly occupied by a Consolidated Edison facility and a New York Power Authority power plant. The district included the neighborhoods of Harlem, Inwood, Marble Hill, Spanish Harlem, Washington Heights, Morningside Heights, and portions of the Manhattan that included Apollo Theater, Columbia University, and Grant's Tomb.

Voting

History 
The district was a Brooklyn-based seat until 1982, when it was realigned to cover the East Side of Manhattan. Following the 1992 redistricting, it became the upper Manhattan seat previously designated the 19th District and the 18th District. After the 2012 redistricting, the 15th became the Bronx's primary district.

List of members representing the district

1803–1823: One seat, then two seats
From 1813 to 1823, two seats were apportioned to the 15th district, elected at-large on a general ticket.

1823–present: One seat

Recent election results 
In New York State electoral politics, there are numerous minor parties at various points on the political spectrum. Certain parties will invariably endorse either the Republican or Democratic candidate for every office, hence the state electoral results contain both the party votes, and the final candidate votes (Listed as "Recap").

See also

List of United States congressional districts
New York's congressional districts
United States congressional delegations from New York

References

External links

 Congressional Biographical Directory of the United States 1774–present
 Clarke, Matthew St. Clair & David A. Hall (1834) "Cases of Contested Elections in Congress, from the Year 1789 to 1834, Inclusive", Gales And Seaton.
 
 
 
 
 

15
Constituencies established in 1803
1803 establishments in New York (state)